Ab Tumhare Hawale Watan Saathiyo is a 2004 Indian war film, directed by Anil Sharma and starring Akshay Kumar, Amitabh Bachchan, Bobby Deol, Divya Khosla Kumar, Sandali Sinha and Nagma.

Plot
Major General Amarjeet Singh (Amitabh Bachchan) is a dedicated officer for the Indian Army. His son Captain Vikramjeet Singh (Bobby Deol) follows in his footsteps and joins the Navy. In 1971 during the Indo-Pak war and the formation of Bangladesh, Lt. Commander Vikramjeet Singh has a ship in his command and a regiment of soldiers of the Indian Army, commandeered by his dad, Major General Amarjeet Singh. The ship comes under attack by a submarine of the Pakistani Navy, undergoes damage, and sinks along with Vikramjeet, but not before he courageously rescues about a hundred trapped army personnel.

Years later, Vikramjeet's son Kunaljeet joins the army as a captain, but he lacks the values his dad and grandfather had in them about serving the country selflessly. He just wants to be employed with the army for a couple of years, then re-locate to the U.S., run a business, and become rich. In order to accomplish this he always makes up excuses of not going to the front. He falls in love with Shweta Bhansali (Divya Khosla Kumar), and decides to stay in the army in order to be close to her. In order to achieve a medal, he fakes heroism; then carelessly jeopardizes a planned attack on terrorists and as a result many terrorists escape to their hideouts. Disciplined and chastised, an injured and humbled Kunaljeet waits to meet his sweetheart - only to find out that she is in love and married to his senior officer Major Rajeev Kumar Singh (Akshay Kumar), who was assumed to be dead but actually was a prisoner of war. The only thread binding him to the army is broken, and it is then Kunaljeet finds out that the terrorists in collusion with rebel Pakistani officers are planning to bomb the Bhagwan Shivji's Amarnath Temple in Jammu & Kashmir in order to forment communal strife. Kunaljeet saves everyone and wins his grandfather's heart.

Cast
 Amitabh Bachchan as Major General Amarjeet Singh (Defence Adviser of India after retirement), Vikramjeet's father and Kunal's grandfather
 Akshay Kumar as Major Rajeev Singh After Promotion Colonel Rajeev Singh, Kunal's senior officer and Shweta's husband
 Bobby Deol as Lt Cdr. Vikramjeet Singh/ Capt. Kunaljeet 'Kunal' Singh After Promotion Major Kunaljeet Singh
 Divya Khosla Kumar as Shweta Bhansali / Shweta Rajeev Singh, Rajeev's wife and Kunal's love interest
 Sandali Sinha as Captain Dr Sakshi Pant
 Nagma as Aarti Vikramjeet Singh, Vikramjeet's wife and Kunal's mother
 Utkarsh Sharma as Kunal / Vikramjeet Singh (Childhood)
 Kapil Sharma as Captain Trilok (deceased in war)
 Danny Denzongpa as Col. Ashfaque Khan
 Ashutosh Rana as Sikander Khan
 Govind Namdeo as Maqbool Butt
 Vivek Shauq
 Surendra Pal
 Aarti Chabria as Trilok's wife
 Arif Zakaria
 Rajesh Vivek
 Vishwajeet Pradhan as Subedar Abdul
 B N Sharma as Police Man

Soundtrack
The music is composed by Anu Malik. Lyrics are penned by Sameer. The Song "Humein Tumse Hua Hai Pyaar" become extremely popular.

Track listing

References

External links
 
 

2004 films
2000s Hindi-language films
Indian war films
Pakistan Navy in fiction
India–Pakistan relations in popular culture
Films scored by Anu Malik
Indian Army in films
Military of Pakistan in films
Films directed by Anil Sharma
2000s war films